Nekane Dolores Gómez Ramos (born 2 September 1999) is a Spanish professional racing cyclist, who last rode for the UCI Women's Team  during the 2019 women's road cycling season.

References

External links

1999 births
Living people
Spanish female cyclists
Place of birth missing (living people)
21st-century Spanish women